Lake Simcoe Regional Airport , formerly the Oro Barrie Orillia Regional Airport, is a registered aerodrome that operates as a regional airport located near Highway 11 in the township of Oro-Medonte, Ontario, Canada. The airport is operated by Lake Simcoe Regional Airport Inc., a municipal service corporation jointly owned by the County of Simcoe (90%) and the City of Barrie (10%).

The airport is classified as an airport of entry by Nav Canada and is staffed by the Canada Border Services Agency (CBSA) on a call-out basis from Billy Bishop Toronto City Airport. CBSA officers at this airport can handle aircraft with no more than 24 passengers. The airport has published instrument approaches.

Improvements

In 2010, the City of Barrie and the Township of Oro-Medonte jointly upgraded and expanded the Lake Simcoe Regional Airport in order to improve operational safety and foster economic activity by leveraging infrastructure to meet growing demand for employment opportunities.

As part of the upgrades and expansion project, the following major works were completed:

 Runway extensions
Taxiway and apron development
Airfield pavement rehabilitation
Air terminal building and parking lot expansion
Airport security and wildlife control fencing upgrades
New airport maintenance facility
Airport access road rehabilitation
Commercial lot development
Sanitary sewer and water distribution system upgrades

Airlines and destinations

See also
Springwater (Barrie Airpark) Aerodrome
Barrie/Little Lake Water Aerodrome
Holland Landing Airpark

References

External links
Official site
Page about this airport on COPA's Places to Fly airport directory

Registered aerodromes in Ontario
Transport in Barrie
Buildings and structures in Simcoe County
Transport in Orillia